Municipal elections took place in Iceland on 14 May 2022 to elect 64 municipal councils, including 5 councils for municipalities that will be formed after the elections as several municipal mergers take effect. The general method used for the election of the councils is party-list proportional representation if two or more party lists are presented for the elections. 49 municipal councils will be elected in that manner. In two municipalities, only a single list was presented, meaning that the candidates on that list are elected to the municipal council without a vote. In the remaining 13 municipalities, no list of candidates was presented. Municipal councils in those municipalities will be elected using a form of plurality block voting were voters write in the names of their preferred candidates.

The largest Icelandic municipality by far is the capital city of Reykjavík with 36% of the population. 11 parties competed in the elections for the 23 seats on the Reykjavík City Council.

Results

Overall

References

Municipal elections in Iceland
Iceland
Municipal
Iceland